L3 Technologies, formerly L-3 Communications Holdings, was an American company that supplied command and control, communications, intelligence, surveillance and reconnaissance (C3ISR) systems and products, avionics, ocean products, training devices and services, instrumentation, aerospace, and navigation products. Its customers included the Department of Defense, Department of Homeland Security, United States Intelligence Community, NASA, aerospace contractors, and commercial telecommunications and wireless customers. In 2019, it merged with Harris Corporation and was renamed to L3Harris Technologies.

L3 was headquartered in Murray Hill, Manhattan, New York City.

History
L3 was formed as L-3 Communications in 1997 to acquire certain business units from Lockheed Martin that had previously been part of Loral Corporation. These units had belonged to Lockheed Corporation and Martin Marietta, which had merged three years before in 1993.  The company was founded by (and named for) Frank Lanza and Robert LaPenta in partnership with Lehman Brothers. Lanza and LaPenta had both served as executives at Loral and Lockheed.

Acquisitions
1997
 Paramax Systems Corporation from Lockheed Martin. Loral had acquired Paramax in 1995
2000
 Training & Simulation Division of Raytheon Systems Co., based in Arlington, Texas. This company was formerly known as Hughes Training, Inc., and part of the Hughes Aircraft Defense Group purchased by Raytheon from General Motors two years earlier. The division traces its ancestry to the original company formed by Edwin Link, inventor of the Link Trainer airplane simulator, and accordingly was renamed Link Simulation and Training (now known as Link Training and Simulation).
2001
 KDI Precision Products, Batavia, Ohio. Electronic fuzing, safe and arm devices.
 Litton Electron Devices from Northrop Grumman (renamed L3 Electron Devices)
2002
 Raytheon Aircraft Integration Systems (renamed L3 Integrated Systems; the Greenville, Texas facility is now known as L3 Mission Integration Division, while the Waco, Texas facility is now known as L3 Platform Integration Division)
 
 SyColeman Corporation, which came about from the joining of Sy Technologies and Coleman Research Corporation.
 PerkinElmer Detection Systems from PerkinElmer which became L-3 Security & Detection Systems.
 Wescam (currently named L3 Harris Wescam)  developer of gyro-stabilized, EO-IR imaging systems.
2003
 Ship Analytics, Inc.
 BF Goodrich Avionics
 L-3 Communication MAS from Bombardier Aerospace.
2004
 Cincinnati Electronics, Mason, Ohio. Infrared detectors & systems, space avionics.
2005
 Titan Corp., after a failed buyout attempt by Lockheed Martin.
 L-3 Communication Combat Propulsion Systems, previously owned by General Dynamics Land Systems.
 L-3 Communications MAPPS, previously CAE's Marine Controls unit
 Electron Dynamic Devices from Boeing Satellite Systems.
 Applied Signal & Image Technology, Linthicum Heights, MD.  Geo-location systems for RF emitters.
 Sonoma Design Group, Santa Rosa, CA.  Stabilized EO/IR sensors.  
2006
 Advanced System Architectures, a company based in Fleet, Hampshire, United Kingdom.  L-3 ASA has core capabilities in the development and through-life management of complex information systems, data fusion and tracking solutions, and interoperable secure communications systems.
 Crestview Aerospace, a company based in northwest Florida. Crestview Aerospace provides aircraft structures, major airframe assemblies, and military aircraft modifications for leading prime contractors and OEMs in the aerospace industry. (Sold in 2017 along with Vertex Aerospace and TCS.)
 Nautronix and MariPro, based in Fremantle, Australia and Santa Barbara, California, respectively, from Nautronix Plc in Aberdeen, Scotland. Nautronix and MariPro provide acoustic ranges and hydrographics to commercial and defense markets.
 TRL Technology, a specialist defense electronics company based in Gloucestershire, UK. TRL Technology is internationally known for development and innovation in the fields of interception, surveillance, electronic warfare, and communications.
2010
 Insight Technology, a company based in Londonderry, New Hampshire. Insight develops and builds optics, from night-vision goggles to weapon-mounted sights and lasers.

2012
 Thales Training and Simulation (partial), a multinational company which manufactures civil and military full flight simulators and provides related training and support services – a wholly owned subsidiary of the Thales Group. In August 2012, L-3 acquired Thales Group's civil fixed-wing flight simulation business, to form L-3 Link Simulation & Training UK.

2015
 CTC Aviation Limited (rebranded in May 2017 as L3 Airline Academy) a company based in Southampton providing training and resourcing to many international airlines.

2016
 MacDonald Humfrey (Automation), a Luton, UK–based checkpoint security and automation company.
 ExMac (Automation), a Droitwich, UK based automated material handling company.

2017
 Open Water Power, a Somerville, Massachusetts–based battery startup spun out of MIT. Its novel aluminum-water battery technology promises a tenfold improvement in the endurance of Unmanned Underwater Vehicles.
 Ocean-Server Technology, a Fall River, Massachusetts–based small business specializing in lithium-ion battery, sensor, and robotic mini-sub (UUV) products
 ASV Global, a Lafayette, Louisiana–based business with international offices in Portchester specializing in Autonomous Surface Vehicles for commercial and defense markets.

2018
 In October 2018, L3 announced an all-stock "merger of equals" with Florida-based Harris Corporation, to be closed (subject to approvals) in mid-2019.  The merger was completed on June 29, 2019, and the new company, L3Harris Technologies, Inc., is based in Melbourne, Florida, where Harris was headquartered.

Business organization
As of 2017, L3 was organized under four business segments:
 Electronic Systems
 Advanced Programs
 Aviation Products and Security
 Power and Propulsion Systems
 Precision Engagement and Training
 Aerospace Systems
 Aircraft Systems
 ISR Systems
 MAS
 Vertex Aerospace
 Communication Systems
 Advanced Communications
 Broadband Communications
 Space and Power
 Tactical SATCOM
 Sensor Systems
 Space & Sensor Systems
 Maritime Sensor Systems
 Worldwide Surveillance & Targeting Missions
 Warrior Sensor Systems

Management
Frank Lanza, CEO and co-founder, died on June 7, 2006. CFO Michael T. Strianese was named as interim CEO, and was later appointed Chairman, President and CEO of the company on October 23, 2006. In 2015, former Lockheed Martin executive Christopher E. Kubasik was named president and COO, with Strianese remaining as chairman and CEO. On July 19, 2017, Strianese announced that he would retire as CEO on December 31, 2017, to be succeeded by Kubasik, but would remain as board chairman.  As of January 1, 2018, Christopher E. Kubasik became chief executive officer and president of L3 Technologies.

Naming 
L3 Technologies was originally named L-3 Communications for the last initials of its founders Frank Lanza, Robert LaPenta, and Lehman Brothers. Despite the similarity in naming, there is no corporate connection between L3 Technologies, formerly known as L-3 Communications, and networking provider Level 3 Communications, whose name is often abbreviated "L3" in informal industry communication.

On December 31, 2016, the company changed its name from L-3 Communications Holdings, Inc. to L3 Technologies, Inc. to better reflect the company's wider focus since its founding in 1997. The company's website changed from L-3com.com to L3T.com, but the company's NYSE ticker symbol of LLL remained the same.

Products
 L-3 ProVision, Millimeter Wave Airport Passenger Screening System
 L-3 eXaminer SX, 3DX, and XLB, Airport baggage scanning systems
 L-3 OptEX, Trace level explosive detection system
 AVCATT, a mobile aviation training simulator
 Orchid, Total Development & Simulation Environment (Power, Marine)
 EOTech, Holographic weapon sights
 L-3 Sonoma EO, Electro Optical Imaging Systems, 1508M Dragon Eyes, 1205MD, 2111X, 2514X, & 2711G

Controversies

Federal contract suspension
In 2010, it was announced that L3's Special Support Programs Division had been suspended by the United States Air Force from doing any contract work for the US federal government. A US Department of Defense investigation had reportedly found that the company had, "used a highly sensitive government computer network to collect competitive business information for its own use." A US federal criminal investigation ended the temporary suspension on July 27, 2010.

Counterfeit parts
On November 4, 2010, L3 issued a part purge notification to prevent future use of Chinese counterfeit parts, but did not notify its customers whose display systems suffered from much higher than expected failure rates.

EOTech defective holographic sights lawsuit
In 2015, L3 Technologies agreed to pay $25.6 million to settle a lawsuit with the U.S. Government. L3 was accused of knowingly providing the U.S. military with optics that failed in extreme temperatures and humid weather conditions. These sights were provided to infantry and special operations forces operating in Afghanistan and Iraq, as well as civilians and law enforcement.

The civil fraud lawsuit was filed by Preet Bharara, in the Southern District of New York.  The lawsuit alleged L3 officials have known since 2006 that the holographic sights being sent to Iraq and Afghanistan failed to perform as advertised in extreme temperature ranges. The lawsuit alleges that the FBI independently discovered the thermal drift defect, where the point-of-aim would shift when the sights were exposed to temperature extremes, in March 2015 and presented EOTech with "the very same findings that the company had documented internally for years. Shortly thereafter, EOTech finally disclosed the thermal drift defect to the DoD." According to court documents, EOTech had advertised that its sights performed in temperatures ranging from -40 degrees to 140 degrees Fahrenheit, and in humid conditions.

See also
 Top 100 Contractors of the U.S. federal government

References

External links
 
 
 

Companies formerly listed on the New York Stock Exchange
Avionics companies
Electronics companies established in 1997
Electronics companies disestablished in 2019
American companies established in 1997
American companies disestablished in 2019
Defense companies of the United States
Electronics companies of the United States
Security equipment manufacturers
Collier Trophy recipients
Abu Ghraib torture and prisoner abuse
1997 establishments in New York (state)
2019 disestablishments in New York (state)
2019 mergers and acquisitions
Former Lockheed Martin companies
Corporate spin-offs
L3Harris Technologies
Defunct manufacturing companies based in New York City